Trichodes apivorus is a species of checkered beetle in the family Cleridae. It is found in Central America and North America.

Subspecies
These two subspecies belong to the species Trichodes apivorus:
 Trichodes apivorus apivorus
 Trichodes apivorus borealis Wolcott & E.A.Chapin, 1918

References

Further reading

External links

 

Trichodes
Articles created by Qbugbot
Beetles described in 1824